Arthur Grey Hazlerigg, 1st Baron Hazlerigg (17 November 1878 – 25 May 1949), known as Sir Arthur Grey Hazlerigg, 13th Baronet, from 1890 to 1945, was a British peer.

Hazlerigg was the son of Lieutenant-Colonel Arthur Grey Hazlerigg, and Jane Edith Orr-Ewing, daughter of Sir Archibald Orr-Ewing, 1st Baronet. Sir Arthur Hesilrige, 2nd Baronet, was an ancestor. His father died when he was only one year old and in 1890, aged 11, he succeeded his grandfather as thirteenth Baronet, of Noseley Hall. He was educated at Eton and Trinity College, Cambridge. He played first-class cricket for Leicestershire from 1907 to 1910, captaining the county during that period. He made 65 appearances for the county. He later served as High Sheriff of Leicestershire in 1909 and as Lord Lieutenant of Leicestershire from 1925 to 1949. On 12 February 1945 he was raised to the peerage as Baron Hazlerigg, of Noseley in the County of Leicester, for his services to the county of Leicestershire.

Lord Hazlerigg married Dorothy Rachel Buxton, daughter of John Henry Buxton, in 1903. He died in May 1949, aged 70, and was succeeded in his titles by his son Arthur. Lady Hazlerigg died in 1972.

He stood for the Conservatives in 1906 but was unsuccessful.

References

References
Kidd, Charles, Williamson, David (editors). Debrett's Peerage and Baronetage (1990 edition). New York: St Martin's Press, 1990.

www.thepeerage.com

1878 births
1949 deaths
People educated at Eton College
Alumni of Trinity College, Cambridge
Lord-Lieutenants of Leicestershire
High Sheriffs of Leicestershire
English cricketers
Leicestershire cricketers
Leicestershire cricket captains
Conservative Party (UK) parliamentary candidates
British sportsperson-politicians
Barons created by George VI
Arthur